Pedro Calderón de la Barca y Barreda González de Henao Ruiz de Blasco y Riaño (17 January 160025 May 1681) was a Spanish dramatist, poet, writer and knight of the Order of Santiago. He is known as one of the most distinguished Baroque writers of the Spanish Golden Age, especially for his plays.

Calderón de la Barca was born in Madrid, where he spent most of his life. He was born on a boat in the Manzanares river, thus the name "de la Barca" added to his father's last name. During his life, he served as soldier and he was a Roman Catholic priest. Born when the Spanish Golden Age theatre was being defined by Lope de Vega, he developed it further, his work being regarded as the culmination of the Spanish Baroque theatre. As such, he is regarded as one of Spain's foremost dramatists and one of the finest playwrights of world literature.

Biography

Pedro Calderón de la Barca was born in Madrid on Friday, 17 January 1600, and was baptized in the parish of San Martín. His father, Diego Calderón, was a hidalgo of mountain origin (Cantabria) and by paternal inheritance he had assumed the position of secretary of the Council and Chief Accounting Office of the Treasury, serving in it the kings Felipe II and Felipe III, died in 1615. His mother, Ana Gonzalez de Henao (or Henaut, Hainaut), was of Flemish or Walloon descent. According to James Fitzmaurice-Kelly, she claimed origin from the De Mons of Hainault. She died when Calderón was ten years old, in 1610. His parents married in 1595. Pedro was the third of the six children that the marriage produced (three boys and three girls), of whom only four survived childhood: Diego, the first-born; Dorotea — nun in Toledo—; Pedro and Jusepe or Josénota—; These brothers were always welcome, as Diego Calderón stated in his will (1647):

However, they also had a natural brother, Francisco, who hid under the surname of "González" and was expelled from the father's house by Don Diego, although he left written in 1615 that he be recognized as legitimate unless he had married "with that woman he tried to marry", in which case he would be disinherited. Calderón was educated at the Jesuit College in Madrid, the Colegio Imperial, with a view to taking orders; but instead, he studied law at Salamanca.

Between 1620 and 1622 Calderón won several poetry contests in honor of St Isidore at Madrid. Calderón's debut as a playwright was Amor, honor y poder, performed at the Royal Palace on 29 June 1623.  This was followed by two other plays that same year: La selva confusa and Los Macabeos. Over the next two decades, Calderón wrote more than 70 plays, the majority of which were secular dramas written for the commercial theatres.

Calderón served with the Spanish army in Italy and Flanders between 1625 and 1635. By the time Lope de Vega died in 1635, Calderón was recognized as the foremost Spanish dramatist of the age. Calderón had also gained considerable favour in the court, and in 1636–1637 he was made a knight of the Order of Santiago by Philip IV, who had already commissioned from him a series of spectacular plays for the royal theatre in the newly built Buen Retiro palace. On 28 May 1640 he joined a company of mounted cuirassiers recently raised by Gaspar de Guzmán, Count-Duke of Olivares, took part in the Catalan campaign, and distinguished himself by his gallantry at Tarragona.  His health failing, Calderón retired from the army in November 1642, and three years later was awarded a special military pension in recognition of his services in the field.

Calderón's biography during the next few years is obscure. His brother, Diego Calderón, died in 1647.  A son, Pedro José, was born to Calderón and an unknown woman between 1647 and 1649; the mother died soon after. Calderón committed his son to the care of his nephew, José, son of Diego.  Perhaps for reasons relating to these personal trials, Calderón became a tertiary of the order of St Francis in 1650, and then finally joined the priesthood. He was ordained in 1651, and became a priest at San Salvador church, in Madrid. According to a statement he made a year or two later, he decided to give up writing secular dramas for the commercial theatres.

Though he did not adhere strictly to this resolution, he now wrote mostly mythological plays for the palace theatres, and autos sacramentales—one-act allegories illustrating the mystery of the Eucharist—for performance during the feast of Corpus Christi. In 1662, two of Calderón's autos, Las órdenes militares and Mística y real Babilonia, were the subjects of an inquiry by the Inquisition; the former was censured, its manuscript copies confiscated, and remained condemned until 1671.

Calderón was appointed honorary chaplain to Philip IV in 1663, and continued as chaplain to his successor. In his eighty-first year he wrote his last secular play, Hado y Divisa de Leonido y Marfisa, in honor of Charles II's marriage to Maria Luisa of Orléans.

Notwithstanding his position at court and his popularity throughout Spain, near the end of his life Calderón struggled with financial difficulties, but with the motivation of the Carnival of 1680 he wrote his last work of comedy, Hado y divisa de Leonido y de Marfisa. He died May 25, 1681, leaving only partially complete the autos sacramentales that he had been working on for that year. His burial was austere and unembellished, as he desired in his will: "Uncovered, as if I deserved to satisfy in part the public vanities of my poorly spent life". In this manner he left the theatres orphaned in which he was considered one of the best dramatic writers of his time.

Style

Calderón initiated what has been called the second cycle of Spanish Golden Age theatre. Whereas his predecessor, Lope de Vega, pioneered the dramatic forms and genres of Spanish Golden Age theatre, Calderón polished and perfected them. Whereas Lope's strength lay in the spontaneity and naturalness of his work, Calderón's strength lay in his capacity for poetic beauty, dramatic structure and philosophical depth. Calderón was a perfectionist who often revisited and reworked his plays, even long after they were first performed. This perfectionism was not just limited to his own work: several of his plays rework existing plays or scenes by other dramatists, improving their depth, complexity, and unity. Calderón excelled above all others in the genre of the "auto sacramental", in which he showed a seemingly inexhaustible capacity to giving new dramatic forms to a given set of theological and philosophical constructs. Calderón wrote 120 "comedias", 80 "autos sacramentales" and 20 short comedic works called entremeses.

As Goethe notes, Calderón tended to write his plays taking special care of their dramatic structure. He therefore usually reduced the number of scenes in his plays as compared to those of Lope de Vega, so as to avoid any superfluity and present only those scenes essential to the play, also reducing the number of different metres in his plays for the sake of gaining a greater stylistic uniformity. Although his poetry and plays leaned towards culteranismo, he usually reduced the level and obscurity of that style by avoiding metaphors and references away from those that uneducated viewers could understand. However, he had a liking for symbolism, for example making a fall from a horse a metaphor of a fall into disgrace, the fall representing dishonour; the use of horoscopes or prophecies at the start of the play as a way of making false predictions about the following to occur, symbolizing the utter uncertainty of future. In addition, probably influenced by Cervantes, Calderón realized that any play was but fiction, and that the structure of the baroque play was entirely artificial. He therefore sometimes makes use of meta-theatrical techniques such as making his characters read in a jocose manner the clichés the author is using, and they are thus forced to follow. Some of the most common themes of his plays were heavily influenced by his Jesuit education. For example, as a reader of Saint Thomas Aquinas and Francisco Suárez, he liked to confront reason against the passions, intellect against instinct, or understanding against will. In common with many writers from the Spanish Golden Age, his plays usually show his vital pessimism, that is only softened by his rationalism and his faith in God; the anguish and distress usually found his œuvre is better exemplified in one of his most famous plays, La vida es sueño (Life Is a Dream), in which Segismundo claims:

Indeed, his themes tended to be complex and philosophical, and express complicated states of mind in a manner that few playwrights have been able to manage. Like Baltasar Gracián, Calderón favoured only the deepest human feelings and dilemmas.

Since Calderón's plays were usually produced at the court of the King of Spain, he had access to the most modern techniques regarding scenography. He collaborated with Cosme Lotti in developing complex scenographies that were integrated in some of his plays, specially his most religious-themed ones such as the Autos Sacramentales, becoming extremely complex allegories of moral, philosophical and religious concepts.

Reception

Although his fame dwindled during the 18th century, he was rediscovered in the early 19th century by the German Romantics. Translations by August Wilhelm Schlegel rekindled interest in the playwright, who, alongside Shakespeare, subsequently became a banner figure for the German Romantic movement. E. T. A. Hoffmann based his 1807 singspiel Liebe und Eifersucht on a play by Calderón, La banda y la flor (The Scarf and the Flower), translated by Schlegel. In subsequent decades, Calderón's work was translated into German numerous times, most notably by Johann Diederich Gries and Joseph von Eichendorff, and found significant reception on the German and Austrian stages under the direction of Goethe, and Joseph Schreyvogel. Later significant German adaptations include Hugo von Hofmannsthal's versions of La vida es sueño and El gran teatro del mundo.

Although best known abroad as the author of Doctor Zhivago, Boris Pasternak produced acclaimed Russian translations of Calderón's plays during the late 1950s. According to his mistress, Olga Ivinskaya, In working on Calderón he received help from Nikolai Mikhailovich Liubumov, a shrewd and enlightened person who understood very well that all the mudslinging and commotion over the novel would be forgotten, but that there would always be a Pasternak. I took finished bits of the translation with me to Moscow, read them to Liubimov at Potapov Street, and then went back to Peredelkino, where I would tactfully ask [Boris Leonidovich] to change passages which, in Liubimov's view departed too far from the original. Very soon after the "scandal" was over, [Boris Leonidovich] received a first payment for the work on Calderón.

Already appropriated as a cultural and identitarian Conservative icon in Spain since Marcelino Menéndez Pelayo in the 19th century, the figure of Calderón de la Barca eventually became a Francoist cultural artifact during the 20th century. In 1881, during a controversial meeting at El Retiro for the commemoration of the two hundredth anniversary of Calderón's death, Menéndez Pelayo drank a toast to the celebration of Calderón's Spain and for the supremacy of the Latin race over "germanic barbarity" (settling accounts with foreign scholars). Félix Sardà y Salvany also claimed Calderón for integrist Catholicism; integrists considered Calderón de la Barca to embody the most brilliant incarnation of the Spanish religious intolerance.
A revival of interest in Calderón scholarship can be attributed to British reception, namely through the works of A. A. Parker (who considered La hija del aire to be his finest work), A. E. Sloman and more recently Bruce Wardropper.

English

Although not well known to the current English-speaking world, Calderón's plays were first adapted into English during the 17th century. For instance, Samuel Pepys recorded attending to some plays during 1667 which were free translations of some of Calderón's. Percy Bysshe Shelley translated a substantial portion of El Mágico prodigioso. Some of Calderón's works have been translated into English, notably by Denis Florence MacCarthy, Edward FitzGerald, Roy Campbell, Edwin Honig, Kenneth Muir & Ann L. Mackenzie, Adrian Mitchell, and Gwynne Edwards.

Works

Plays 
Amor, honor y poder (Love, Honor and Power) (1623)
El sitio de Breda (The Siege of Breda) (1625)

La dama duende (The Phantom Lady) (1629)
Casa con dos puertas (The House with Two Doors) (1629)
La vida es sueño (Life is a Dream) (1629–1635)
El purgatorio de San Patricio (The Purgatory of St. Patrick) (before 1635)
El mayor encanto, amor (Love, the Greatest Enchantment) (1635)
Los tres mayores prodigios (The Three Greatest Wonders) (1636)
La devoción de la Cruz (Devotion to the Cross) (1637)
El mágico prodigioso (The Mighty Magician) (1637)
A secreto agravio, secreta venganza (Secret Vengeance for Secret Insult) (1637)
El médico de su honra (The Surgeon of his Honor) (1637)
El pintor de su deshonra (The Painter of His Dishonor) (1640s)
El alcalde de Zalamea (The Mayor of Zalamea) (1651)
La hija del aire (The Daughter of the Air) (1653)
Eco y Narciso (Eco and Narcissus) (1661)
La estatua de Prometeo (Prometheus' Statue)
El prodigio de Alemania (The Prodigy of Germany) (in collaboration with Antonio Coello)

Operas
Celos aun del aire matan 1660

Autos Sacramentales (Sacramental plays)
La cena del rey Baltazar (The Banquet of King Balthazar)
El gran teatro del mundo (The Great Theater of the World)
El gran mercado del mundo (The World is a Fair)

Comedies 
For a time the comedic works of Calderón were underestimated, but have since been reevaluated and have been considered as masterfully composed works as being classified in the genre of comedias de enredo, such as his works La dama duende (The Phantom Lady), Casa con dos puertas, mala es de guardar (A house with two doors is difficult to guard), or El galán fantasma (The Heroic Phantom).

In modern literature
Calderón de la Barca appears in the 1998 novel The Sun over Breda, by Arturo Pérez-Reverte, which takes up the assumption that he served in the Spanish Army at Flanders and depicts him during the sack of Oudkerk by Spanish troops, helping the local librarian save books from the library in the burning town hall.

Notes

References

 
 Calderón de la Barca, Pedro. Life's a Dream: A Prose Translation.  Trans. and ed. Michael Kidd (Boulder, Colorado, 2004).  Forthcoming in a bilingual edition from Aris & Phillips (U.K.).
 Calderón de la Barca, Pedro.  Obras completas / don Pedro Calderon de la Barca.  Ed. Angel Valbuena Briones. 2 Vols.  Tolle: Aguilar, 1969–.
 Cotarelo y Mori, D. Emilio. Ensayo sobre la vida y obras de D. Pedro Calderón de la Barca. Ed. Facs. Ignacio Arellano y Juan Manuel Escudero. Biblioteca Áurea Hispánica. Madrid;Frankfurt: Iberoamericana; Veuvuert, 2001.
 Cruickshank, Don W.  "Calderón and the Spanish Book trade."  Bibliographisches Handbuch der Calderón-Forschung / Manual Bibliográfico Calderoniano.  Eds Kurt y Roswitha Reichenberger.  Tomo III.  Kassel: Verlag Thiele & Schwarz, 1981. 9–15.
 Cruickshank, Don W. Don Pedro Calderón. Cambridge and New York: Cambridge University Press, 2009. 
 De Armas, Frederick A. The Return of Astraea: An Astral-Imperial Myth in Calderón. Lexington: University of Kentucky Press, 1986. 
 
 Greer, Margaret Rich.  The Play of Power: Mythological Court Dramas of Calderón de la Barca.  Princeton, N.J.: Princeton UP, 1991.
 
 Muratta Bunsen, Eduardo.  "Los topoi escépticos en la dramaturgia calderoniana". Rumbos del Hispanismo, Ed. Debora Vaccari, Roma, Bagatto, 2012. 185–192. 
 Parker, Alexander Augustine. The Allegorical Drama of Calderon, an introduction to the Autos sacramentales. Oxford, Dolphin Book, 1968.
 
 Regalado, Antonio.  "Sobre Calderón y la modernidad." Estudios sobre Calderón.  Ed. Javier Aparicio Maydeu.  Tomo I.  Clásicos Críticos.  Madrid: Istmo, 2000.  39–70.
 Kurt & Roswitha Reichenberger: "Bibliographisches Handbuch der Calderón-Forschung /Manual bibliográfico calderoniano (I): Die Calderón-Texte und ihre Überlieferung". Kassel, Edition Reichenberger 1979. 
 Kurt & Roswitha Reichenberger: "Bibliographisches Handbuch der Calderón-Forschung /Manual bibliográfico calderoniano (II, i): Sekundärliteratur zu Calderón 1679–1979: Allgemeines und "comedias". Estudios críticos sobre Calderón 1679–1979: Generalidades y comedias". Kassel, Edition Reichenberger 1999. 
 Kurt & Roswitha Reichenberger: "Bibliographisches Handbuch der Calderón-Forschung /Manual bibliográfico calderoniano (II, ii):Sekundärliteratur zu Calderón 1679–1979: Fronleichnamsspiele, Zwischenspiele und Zuschreibungen. Estudios críticos sobre Calderón 1679–1979: Autos sacramentales, obras cortas y obras supuestas". Kassel, Edition Reichenberger 2003. 
 Kurt & Roswitha Reichenberger: "Bibliographisches Handbuch der Calderón-Forschung /Manual bibliográfico calderoniano (III):Bibliographische Beschreibung der frühen Drucke". Kassel, Edition Reichenberger 1981. 
 Rodríguez, Evangelina y Antonio Tordera.  Calderón y la obra corta dramática del siglo XVII.  London: Tamesis, 1983.
 Ruano de la Haza, José M.  "La Comedia y lo Cómico."   Del horror a la Risa / los géneros dramáticos clásicos.  Kassel: Edition Reichenberger, 1994.  269–285.
 Ruiz-Ramón, Francisco Calderón y la tragedia. Madrid: Alhambra, 1984.
 Roger Ordono, "Conscience de rôle dans Le Grand Théâtre du monde de Calderón de la Barca", Le Cercle Herméneutique, n°18 – 19, La Kédia. Gravité, soin, souci, sous la direction de G.Charbonneau, Argenteuil, 2012. 
 
 Sullivan, Henry W. Calderón in the German Lands and the Low Countries: His Reception and Influence 1654–1980."Cambridge: Cambridge University Press, 1983. 
 

Attribution

Sources
Corrections have been made to biographical information using
Cotarelo y Mori, D. Emilio.  Ensayo sobre la vida y obras de D. Pedro Calderón de la Barca''.  Ed. Facs.  Ignacio Arellano y Juan Manuel Escudero.  Biblioteca Áurea Hispánica.  Madrid;Frankfurt: Iberoamericana; Veuvuert, 2001.
The style section uses the following bibliographical information
Kurt & Roswitha Reichenberger: "Bibliographisches Handbuch der Calderón-Forschung /Manual bibliográfico calderoniano (I): Die Calderón-Texte und ihre Überlieferung durch Wichser". Kassel, Edition Reichenberger 1979. 
Enrique Ruul Fernandez, "Estudio y Edición crítica de Celos aun del aire matan, de Pedro Calderón de la Barca", UNED, 2004. 
"A Hundred Years dressing Calderón", Sociedad Estatal para la acción cultural exterior, 2009.

External links

 
 
 
 A site in Spanish about Calderón at the Biblioteca Virtual Miguel de Cervantes. Includes texts, video, images, and more biographical information.

Spanish poets
Baroque writers
Spanish Baroque people
Spanish Golden Age
1600 births
1681 deaths
Spanish male dramatists and playwrights
Spanish male poets
Writers from Madrid
Spanish people of Dutch descent
Spanish people of Flemish descent
People from Madrid
Spanish Roman Catholic priests
Spanish Catholic poets
Roman Catholic writers
University of Salamanca alumni
17th-century Spanish dramatists and playwrights
17th-century Spanish poets